Niall Corcoran (born 9 July 1982) is a hurling coach and former player at senior level for the Dublin county team until 2016.

County Hurling
He won the All-Ireland Minor Hurling Championship with Galway in 2000. He made his championship debut with Dublin against Westmeath in the quarter final of the Leinster Senior Hurling Championship. Corcoran won the National Hurling League with Dublin in 2011.

Corcoran coaches with Kilmacud Crokes. Corcoran is easy to pick out on the pitch, as he wears a distinctive black and red Mycro helmet.

In 2018, Corcoran joined Eddie Brennan's Laois hurling backroom team. After coaching the Laois hurlers, he joined Davy Fitzgerald's Wexford backroom team when Brennan left the Laois job at the end of 2020.

References

Living people
1982 births
Dublin inter-county hurlers
Galway hurlers
Hurling coaches
Kilmacud Crokes hurlers
Leinster inter-provincial hurlers
Meelick-Eyrecourt hurlers